Brandhoek New Military Cemetery is a Commonwealth War Graves Commission burial ground for the dead of the First World War located near Ypres (Dutch: Ieper) in Belgium on the Western Front.

The cemetery grounds were assigned to the United Kingdom in perpetuity by King Albert I of Belgium in recognition of the sacrifices made by the British Empire in the defence and liberation of Belgium during the war.

Foundation

The cemetery was begun by the British in July 1917 to replace the nearby Brandhoek Military Cemetery, which closed with the arrival of the 32nd, 3rd Australian and 44th Casualty Clearing Stations as part of the preparations for the Battle of Passchendaele.

The cemetery closed a month later and Brandhoek New Military No 3 Cemetery opened to replace it.

The cemetery was designed by Sir Reginald Blomfield.

Notable graves
Buried here is Oxford-born Captain Dr Noel Godfrey Chavasse, VC and bar MC. The Victoria Cross is Britain and the Commonwealth's highest award for bravery. Captain Chavasse was a doctor who repeatedly saved wounded men whilst being  wounded himself on more than one occasion, and under heavy fire, with total disregard for his own safety. Chavasse was one of only three people to have won the Victoria Cross twice, once on 9 August 1916 at Guillemont, in France and later at Brandhoek, where he died from wounds sustained in the operation he was decorated for, along with his batman Private Charles Rudd of St Helen. Also buried here is Army Chaplain, Reverend Frank Robert Harbord, CF4 who was in civilian life the Vicar of Dunchurch, Rugby since 1912 and had been a Chaplain in the Army during the Second Boer War.

References

External links

 
 

Commonwealth War Graves Commission cemeteries in Belgium
Cemeteries and memorials in West Flanders